The Wichita State Shockers softball team represents Wichita State University in NCAA Division I college softball.  The team participates in the American Athletic Conference. The Shockers are currently led by head coach Kristi Bredbenner. The team plays its home games at Wilkins Stadium located on the university's campus.

History

Coaching history

Source:

Coaching staff

References

 
American Athletic Conference softball